Bag of Oats is a six-track extended play by the Australian folk punk band, Mutiny. It was released in 2002 via Haul Away Records. All the tracks were written by the group's Greg Stainsby.

Reception 

Andy Carr of Roaring Jack Archives reviewed both Bag of Oats (2002) and the following three-track, "Digging for Gold", issued later in the same year. He observed, "Throughout there's a spirit of rebellion and an understanding that there are ways out of the poverty and meaninglessness of life in the suburbs. The historic angle comes into play in songs like 'Police Strike Riot', which relives the police strike which left Melbourne lawless briefly in 1929... One of the standouts for me is the slower and hugely melodic 'Struggle Town' and its stories of fighting in the streets" Shite n Onions Brian Gillispie felt, "[it] will knock yer pegleg off. The lyrics of folk songs should tell the listener about what's really going on in their particular part of the world, and with songs that speak about current and historical issues, that's exactly what Mutiny does, and with a true Aussie accent throughout the vocals to boot. Musically, the album has no weak spots either. It really is folk punk for punk folks. I tried to pick a favorite track from this album, but I couldn't do it. Each and every song is as solid as stone."

Track listing

All tracks were written by Greg Stainsby.
 "Bag of Oats" – 3:02
 "William Jones" – 3:06
 "Shot Tower" – 3:39
 "Struggle Town" – 2:48
 "Two Up Alley" – 3:16
 "Police Strike Riot" – 1:47

Credits:

Personnel 

 Alice Green – bass guitar
 Briony Grigg – backing vocals
 Chris Patches – lead vocals, acoustic guitar
 Damien Shepherd – drums (tracks 5–6)
 Greg Stainsby – guitar, mandolin, vocals

 Lobby – tin whistle, trumpet
 Phil – piano accordion
 Sean – drums (tracks 1–4)
 Steph – fiddle

Credits:

References

Mutiny (band) albums